Demba Sow (born 3 July 1993) is a Mauritanian professional footballer who currently plays as a defender for ESM Gonfreville.

International career

International goals
Scores and results list Mauritania's goal tally first.

References

External links 
 

1993 births
Living people
Mauritanian footballers
Mauritania international footballers
French footballers
French sportspeople of Mauritanian descent
ESM Gonfreville players
Association football defenders